Sport Luanda e Benfica, commonly known as Benfica de Luanda, or simply as Benfica, is a football club from Luanda, Angola. The club was established as the Luanda affiliate of SL Benfica of Portugal, and shares the same colours. The logo is also very similar to the Portuguese one. The club, as of 2019, has never won the Girabola (the Angolan league first division).

The club is nicknamed Águias de Luanda, meaning "Luanda Eagles" (the eagle is the symbol of SL Benfica).

History
The club was founded as Sport Luanda e Benfica and later renamed to Saneamento Rangol. In 2000, the club returned to its original name, Sport Luanda e Benfica.

In 1995, as Saneamento Rangol, the club was promoted to the following year's first division. In 2003, Benfica de Luanda was relegated to the second division. In 2004, the club finished second in the second division, and was promoted to the first division. In 2005, the club finished 6th in the first division.

2017 Girabola
On January 23, 2017, Benfica de Luanda issued a press release stating that it would not participate in the Girabola, citing financial reasons, and that the club would focus on its youth academy and in turning the club into a sports company. With such decision, the club is liable to a heavy penalty by the Angolan Federation that might include a suspension from the girabola for an established period

Names
1922 : Founded as Sport Luanda e Benfica
19?? : Renamed Saneamento Rangol
2000 : Renamed  Sport Luanda e Benfica

League & Cup Positions

Domestic history

Continental history

1 Benfica were ejected from the competition for fielding an ineligible player.

Honours
Angola Cup (1) 2014
 Angola SuperCup (1) 2007

Stadium
The club plays their home matches at the state-owned 12,000 capacity Estádio dos Coqueiros. However, work began in 2012 in the Luanda outskirts village of Cacuaco on the construction of their own stadium, with all the requirements for training and camp for their players. Sport Luanda e Benfica members believe that the club will become a role model in the near future.

Players and staff

Players

Manager history

See also
 Girabola
 Gira Angola

References

External links
  
 Girabola.com profile
 Zerozero.pt profile
 Facebook profile

 RSSSF
 RSSSF
 RSSSF
 RSSSF
 RSSSF

Football clubs in Angola
Football clubs in Luanda
Association football clubs established in 1922
1922 establishments in Angola
Sports clubs in Angola
Luanda